Shcherbak is a Ukrainian-language surname.  Shcherba (Щерба) is a Ukrainian term for certain kinds of soup and is related to the Persian word "shorba" with the same meaning.

The surname may refer to:

Denis Shcherbak
Dmytro Shcherbak
Oksana Shcherbak
Vladimir Shcherbak:
Vladimir Shcherbak (footballer, born 1970)
Vladimir Shcherbak (footballer, born 1959)
Vladimir Shcherbak (politician)
Yuriy Shcherbak

See also
 
 Shcherba
 Shcherbakov (disambiguation)

Ukrainian-language surnames